Bogor Ring Road, sometimes called BRR or BORR, is a tolled ring road located in the city of Bogor, West Java, Indonesia.

History
The construction of the first section was finished in 2009 and inaugurated by Minister of Public Works, Djoko Kirmanto on 23 November 2009.

Sections
BRR is divided into 3 sections, it is planned to cross 11 villages in Bogor and 1 village in Bogor Regency.

Exits

Fee

See also
 Transport in Indonesia
Trans-Java Toll Road
List of toll roads in Indonesia

References

External links

Toll roads in Indonesia
Transport in West Java
Bogor
Ring roads in Indonesia